Streptomyces bottropensis is a bacterium species from the genus Streptomyces which has been isolated from soil. Streptomyces bottropensis produces bottromycin, dunaimycin and mensacarcin. Streptomyces bottropensis can metabolize (+)-carvone to (+)-bottrospicatol.

See also 
 List of Streptomyces species

References

Further reading

External links
Type strain of Streptomyces bottropensis at BacDive -  the Bacterial Diversity Metadatabase

bottropensis
Bacteria described in 1961